General Sir Leslie Chasemore Hollis,  (9 February 1897 – 9 August 1963) was a Royal Marines officer who served as Commandant General Royal Marines from 1949 to 1952.

Military career
Hollis was commissioned into the Royal Marine Light Infantry in 1914 and served in the First World War in the Grand Fleet and the Harwich Force.

Between the wars he attended the Royal Naval College, Greenwich from 1927 to 1928, and later served on the staff of the Commander-in-Chief Africa Station and of the Plans Division at the Admiralty before being appointed Assistant Secretary of the Committee of Imperial Defence in 1936.

He served in the Second World War as Senior Assistant Secretary in the War Cabinet Office. He was present at virtually every major decision during that period, attending all the major conferences—Washington, Cairo, Tehran, Yalta and Potsdam—and was instrumental in establishing what became known as the Cabinet War Rooms (now known the Churchill War Rooms).

After the war Hollis became Deputy Secretary (Military) to the Cabinet in 1947 and Commandant General Royal Marines in 1949. He was credited with saving the Royal Marines from being disbanded, and retired in 1952.

References

Bibliography

Further reading
Hollis, Leslie One Marine's Tale, published 1956
Hollis, Leslie The Captain General. A life of H.R.H. Prince Philip, Duke of Edinburgh, KG, Captain General, Royal Marines, published 1961

External links

Generals of World War II
Royal Marine (RM) Officers 1939−1945

1897 births
1963 deaths
Graduates of the Royal Naval College, Greenwich
War Office personnel in World War II
Foreign recipients of the Legion of Merit
Knights Commander of the Order of the Bath
Knights Commander of the Order of the British Empire
People from Bath, Somerset
Royal Marines generals
Royal Marines generals of World War II
Royal Marines personnel of World War I
Military personnel from Somerset